Susmita Basu Majumdar is an Indian historian, epigraphist and numismatist. She is a professor in the Department of Ancient Indian History at the University of Calcutta. With her nom-de-plume Adaa, she is a poet in the Hindi and Urdu languages, and a musician.

Life
Susmita Basu Majumdar obtained a bachelor's degree from Lady Brabourne College, followed by master's and doctoral degrees from the University of Calcutta.

Research

Ashokan Circuit
In 1986, the roof of the Chandrala Parameshwari Temple at Sannati, Karnataka collapsed, revealing Brahmi inscriptions on the stone base of the deity. These comprised edicts 1 and 2 and rock edicts 12 and 14 of Ashoka, revealing Sannati as an important Buddhist shrine from the Mauryan period. Calcutta University began a project to document the Ashokan circuit in Karnataka. Majumdar was heading the project in 2016 when the broken original idol of Mahakali was found outside the temple walls, resulting in the restoration of the idol.

Majumdar published booklets on the Ashokan circuit (The Mauryans in Karnataka) and a trilingual English-Pali-Kannada dictionary.

Numismatics and epigraphy
Majumdar investigated the shaping of trade by foreign and domestic currencies on the Malabar coast. Contrasting the prevalence of Roman copper coins in Chola and Pandya territories with the preponderance of Roman silver coins (and lack of copper coins) in Chera territories, she showed that this was likely due to the Cheras being the regional power in Kerala, issuing copper coins. She introduced a methodology to examine the commerce between Rome and India based on the coinage unearthed at Pattanam.

Kushan coinage in Bengal
A cache of 83 coins was found in East Midnapore by Aurobindo Maity, a retired high school teacher attempting to locate and archive informal relics in the region. These were identified as Kushan coins from the periods of Kanishka and Huvishka, as part of Majumdar's research.

Music and poetry
Majumdar has collaborated with santoor maestro Pandit Sandip Chatterjee in an album titled Lyrical Fusion, providing lyrics in Urdu as well as vocals.

Her book Triangulum: Trilingual poetry comprising her poetry in Urdu was published in 2015.

Selected works

Articles

Books

Music and poetry

References 

Living people
Lady Brabourne College alumni
Academic staff of the University of Calcutta
University of Calcutta alumni
21st-century Indian historians
People from Bhilai
Urdu-language poets from India
Hindi-language poets
Indian women historians
Scholars from Chhattisgarh
Women educators from Chhattisgarh
Women educators from West Bengal
21st-century Indian women writers
Year of birth missing (living people)
21st-century pseudonymous writers
Pseudonymous women writers